The Grand Central Oyster Bar & Restaurant is a seafood restaurant located on the lower level of Grand Central Terminal at 42nd Street and Park Avenue in Manhattan, New York City.

History
The restaurant space was first opened as the Grand Central Terminal Restaurant. Although Grand Central Terminal opened on February 2, 1913, its opening was celebrated one day prior, February 1, with a dinner at the restaurant, arranged for Warren and Wetmore along with 100 guests.

The restaurant was operated by The Union News Company. It closed briefly for renovations following a 1997 fire.

Jerome Brody sold the Oyster Bar to employees in 1999, and died in 2001. Brody chose to sell to staff to preserve the union and employee satisfaction in his transition. As of 2017, all non-union, managerial staff are part of the Employee Stock Ownership Program (ESOP). The initial group of managers bought a near-majority of the company's stock with a loan between 1999 and 2001. They purchased the remainder between 2004 and 2008.

In 2016, the Zagat Survey gave it a food rating of 22/30, "Very Good To Excellent".

The Oyster Bar closed for a majority of 2020 during the COVID-19 pandemic. It briefly reopened for two weeks and closed again when its underground location failed to attract foot traffic. It then resumed its activities back to normal business from 2021 on.

Architecture
Its architecture features the vaulted, Guastavino tiled ceilings common in the era of its construction.  The archway in front of the restaurant is also famous for an acoustical quirk making it a whispering gallery by which someone standing in one corner can hear someone standing in the opposite corner perfectly no matter how softly they speak.

Branches
Two Japanese branches have opened in Tokyo. The first, the GCOBR Shinagawa, is located on the 4th floor of Atre Shinagawa in the Shinagawa Station. The second, GCOBR Marunouchi, is located in Marunouchi MY PLAZA near Tokyo Station. A small branch is located in Terminal C at Newark Liberty International Airport.

Gallery

See also

 List of oyster bars
 List of restaurants in New York City
 List of seafood restaurants
 Ratskeller

References

External links

 
 Oyster Bar Tokyo website 

1913 establishments in New York City
Restaurants established in 1913
Restaurants in Manhattan
Restaurants in Tokyo
Seafood restaurants in New York (state)
Oyster bars in the United States
Oyster Bar and Restaurant
James Beard Foundation Award winners
Employee-owned companies of the United States
Seafood restaurants in Japan